Mohammadabad (also Romanized as Moḩammadābād; also known as Muhammadābād and Mukhammabad) is a village in Sojas Rud Rural District, Sojas Rud District, Khodabandeh County, Zanjan Province, Iran. At the 2006 census, its population was 475, in 92 families.

References 

Populated places in Khodabandeh County